Anarithma metula is a species of sea snail, a marine gastropod mollusk in the family Mitromorphidae.

Description
The length of the shell varies between 3.5 mm and 7 mm.

The five whorls are flattened. They are obsoletely ribbed and transversely striated. The suture shows a raised line. The outer lip is inflected in the middle. The color of the shell is yellowish brown, banded with chestnut.

Distribution
This marine species occurs from Eastern Transkei, South Africa, Mozambique and Madagascar to the Philippines, Fiji, Papua New Guinea, Hawaii

References

 Iredale, Tom, "On some new and old molluscan generic names";. Proc. Malac. Soc. Lond. 12: 140–201, pls. 8–10 
 Severns, M. (2011) Shells of the Hawaiian Islands - The Sea Shells. Conchbooks, Hackenheim. 564 pp.
 Liu, J.Y. [Ruiyu] (ed.). (2008). Checklist of marine biota of China seas. China Science Press. 1267 pp.
 Cernohorsky, W.O. (1988b) Taxonomic notes on the Mitromorpha group of the family Turridae (Mollusca: Gastropoda: Borsoniinae). Records of the Auckland Institute and Museum, 25, 63–73

External links
 MNHN: Mitromorpha metula
 Chenu J.C. (1842-1854). Illustrations conchyliologiques, ou description et figures de toutes les coquilles connues, vivantes et fossiles. 85 parts in 4 volumes, Paris

Anarithma
Gastropods described in 1843